Dead Alive is the fourth album by the Christian metal band, Soul Embraced. It is the first and last album to feature rhythm guitarist Devin Castle, and the last to feature drummer Lance Garvin.

Critical reception

Giving the album an eight out of ten from Cross Rhythms, Peter John Willoughby states, "The lyrics are bound to unsettle, but you have to bear in mind that this is for the death metal scene and will not be suitable for an impressionable young teenager." Jason B, rating the album for Indie Vision Music an eight out of ten, says, "this is metal done right." Awarding the album seven out of ten, in a second review at Indie Vision Music, Josh Murphy describes, "Soul Embraced is capable of so much more than this." Zachary Zinn of Jesus Freak Hideout expresses "Soul Embraced knew what they were doing when they wrote Dead Alive. Luckily they didn't fall into the trap that many metal bands do- every song sounding the same with no originality in the mix. This will be a great addition to any metal-head's collection."

Track listing

Credits
Soul Embraced
 Chad Moore - Vocals
 Rocky Gray - Lead Guitar, Engineer, Mixing
 Jeff Bowie - Bass
 Devin Castle - Rhythm Guitar
 Lance Garvin - Drums
Production
 Alan Douches - Mastering
 Barry Poynter - Audio Production, Engineer, Additional Guitars, Producer
 Erik Rutan - Mixing
Art
 Ryan Clark - A&R, Package Design
 Adam Peterson - Photography

References

Soul Embraced albums
2008 albums
Solid State Records albums